Mae Chan in Thailand may refer to:
 Mae Chan District
 Mae Chan Subdistrict
 Mae Chan Municipality
 Mae Chan, Umphang, subdistrict in Umphang District, Tak
 Mae Chan Fault, east–west strike fault in Northern Thailand